Fanta Dao (born 7 March 1973) is a Malian sprinter. She competed in the women's 400 metres at the 1992 Summer Olympics.

References

External links
 

1973 births
Living people
Athletes (track and field) at the 1992 Summer Olympics
Malian female sprinters
Olympic athletes of Mali
Place of birth missing (living people)
Olympic female sprinters
21st-century Malian people